"Simply Beautiful" is a 1972 song by Al Green from his album I'm Still in Love with You.

Legacy
American R&B group Destiny's Child sampled the song on the track "Bridges" from their 1998 self-titled debut album. American singer Mary J. Blige's "PMS" sampled the song on her 2001 album, No More Drama. It was sampled by producer Kanye West for rapper Talib Kweli's song "Good to You," on Kweli's 2002 album Quality. American rap group G-Unit also sampled the song on "Good to Me", from their mixtape, Return of the Body Snatchers. American musician Kid Cudi sampled the song on his track "Livin’ My Truth" from his 2022 album Entergalactic.

Covers
In 2004, Queen Latifah covered the song for her debut all singing album, The Dana Owens Album. Al Green himself provided vocals for a duet. The song was released as a music video, but was never officially released as a single.

In 2008, Maxwell appeared on the 2008 BET Awards, where he performed the song in a tribute to Al Green. He also included the song in his set list during his 2009 BLACKsummers'night tour.

The band Fantômas often use the song as a filler.

Jazz singer José James covered the song on his 2014 album, While You Were Sleeping.

References

Al Green songs
Queen Latifah songs
1972 singles
Songs written by Al Green
1972 songs